is a 2001 Japanese comedy film written and directed by Shinobu Yaguchi, about five boys who start a synchronized swimming team at their high school.  The film stars Satoshi Tsumabuki (Suzuki, the leader of the team), Hiroshi Tamaki (Sato), Akifumi Miura (Ohta), Koen Kondo (Kanazawa), Takatoshi Kaneko (Saotome) and Naoto Takenaka (the dolphin trainer).

The film was a success in Japan, and was nominated for eight prizes at the Japan Academy Prize, winning awards for 'Best Newcomer' and 'Best Music Score'.  A spin-off television series entered its third season in 2005.

Plot
Suzuki is a high-school student who aspires to become a great swimmer; however, he is the only person in the school's swimming team. Soon, a beautiful new swimming teacher starts work at the high school. Dozens of boys decide to join the swimming team, but when they realize that she teaches synchronized swimming (which is generally a women's sport), all but Suzuki and four other boys drop out.  The teacher soon takes maternity leave, and for some time the team is on hiatus. However, when Suzuki watches a dolphin show he decides to ask the dolphin trainer to be their coach.
  
The dolphin trainer exploits them as free labour and has no intention of training them, and in an attempt to ditch them, leaves all his cash with them to have to practice "rhythm" using Dance Dance Revolution. When he runs out of gas, he returns to get some money and discovers that they are totally synchronized and doing well with the game. He takes them back and they continue to train. Later, while training in the sea, a tourist with a video camera films them, thinking that they are drowning, and the boys appear on TV. Seeing this, the boys who had quit rejoin, and are taught synchronized swimming by the five boys.

Before the festival, the pool is drained when the water is used to fight a fire that is caused by a fair attraction, but the neighboring girls' school allows them to use their pool. The performance turns out to be a great success.

Cast 
 Satoshi Tsumabuki - Suzuki
 Hiroshi Tamaki - Sato
 Akifumi Miura - Ohta
 Koen Kondo - Kanazawa
 Takatoshi Kaneko - Saotome
 Aya Hirayama - Shizuko Kiuchi
 Kaori Manabe - Mrs. Sakuma
 Takashi Kawamura - Ikeuchi
 Hiroshi Matsunaga - Mochizuki
 Yuya Nishikawa - Sakamoto
 Katsuyuki Yamazaki - Yama-chan
 Taiyo Sugiura - Taiyo
 Koutaro Tanaka - Koutarou
 Makoto Ishihara - Makoto

Spin-offs

TV series
 Water Boys
 Water Boys 2
 Water Boys 2005 Natsu

External links
 Waterboys official website
 
 

2001 films
Japanese sports comedy films
2000s sports comedy films
Synchronized swimming films
Comedy films based on actual events
Sports films based on actual events
Japanese teen comedy films
Films directed by Shinobu Yaguchi
2000s teen comedy films
2001 comedy films
2000s Japanese films